WISE J222055.31−362817.4 (designation abbreviated to WISE 2220−3628) is a brown dwarf of spectral class Y0, located in constellation Grus at approximately 26 light-years from Earth.

Discovery
WISE 2220−3628 was discovered in 2012 by J. Davy Kirkpatrick et al. from data, collected by Wide-field Infrared Survey Explorer (WISE) Earth-orbiting satellite — NASA infrared-wavelength 40 cm (16 in) space telescope, which mission lasted from December 2009 to February 2011. In 2012 Kirkpatrick et al. published a paper in The Astrophysical Journal, where they presented discovery of seven new found by WISE brown dwarfs of spectral type Y, among which also was WISE 2220−3628.

Properties
Y-class dwarfs are among the coldest of all brown dwarfs.

Distance

See also	
 List of star systems within 25–30 light-years	
WISE 0146+4234 (Y0)
WISE 0350−5658 (Y1)
WISE 0359−5401 (Y0)
WISE 0535−7500 (≥Y1)
WISE 0713−2917 (Y0)
WISE 0734−7157 (Y0)

References

Brown dwarfs
Y-type stars
Grus (constellation)
WISE objects